James Patrick "Happy" Feller (born June 13, 1949) is a former American football kicker in the National Football League. He was drafted by the Philadelphia Eagles in the fourth round of the 1971 NFL Draft and played for one season for the team. He played for two seasons with the New Orleans Saints. He played college football at Texas.

Early years
Feller was nicknamed "Happy" because he smiled often as a child.

College career
Feller played college football for the Texas Longhorns. He beat out Rob Layne, who started in 1967, for the starting kicker job before the start of the 1968 season. In 1968, Feller went 8-of-16 for field goals and 30-of-32 for extra point attempts. He made a 53-yarder against Oklahoma, a school record.

In the season-opener in 1969 against the California Golden Bears, Feller kicked a 32-yard field goal in the third quarter and went two-for-two for extra point attempts. In week two against Texas Tech, he converted all seven extra points. He went seven-for-seven for extra point attempts on October 4 against Navy. In the Red River Shootout against Oklahoma on October 11, Feller kicked two field goals of 27 and 21 yards and converted all three extra point attempts as the Longhorns beat the Sooners 27–17. He had a 24-yard field goal and converted all four extra point attempts against Rice on October 25. Feller made a 32-yard field goal and converted all six extra point attempts against SMU on November 1. Against Baylor on November 8, he made all five extra point attempts. He went five-for-six on extra point attempts against TCU on November 15. Against the Texas A&M Aggies on November 27, Feller made a 43-yard field goal and converted four-of-seven extra point attempts. He converted on his only extra point attempt to give the Longhorns the win in the "Game of the Century" against Arkansas on December 6. In the Cotton Bowl Classic against Notre Dame on January 1, Feller went three-for-three for extra point attempts.

NFL career
Feller was drafted in the fourth round of the 1971 NFL Draft by the Philadelphia Eagles. He was the first kicker selected in the draft. He played in 21 total games. He attempted 20 kicks in his rookie season, making just six. His longest field goal was from 50 yards out. It was his only season with the Eagles, as he spent the other two seasons with the Saints. In his second season, he went 6-for-11 in field goals, with his longest being from 46 yards. The 1973 season was his last professional season. He went 4-for-12 on field goals, with his longest being from 18 yards out.

References

1949 births
Living people
American football placekickers
Texas Longhorns football players
Philadelphia Eagles players
New Orleans Saints players
People from Fredericksburg, Texas
Players of American football from Texas